Monkeybone is a 2001 American black comedy fantasy film directed by Henry Selick, written by Sam Hamm, produced by Michael Barnathan and Mark Radcliffe, and executive produced by Chris Columbus, Selick, and Hamm. The film combines live-action with stop-motion animation.

Loosely based on Kaja Blackley's graphic novel Dark Town, the film stars an ensemble cast led by Brendan Fraser, Bridget Fonda, and Whoopi Goldberg with Rose McGowan, Dave Foley, Giancarlo Esposito, Megan Mullally, Lisa Zane, Chris Kattan, Bob Odenkirk, an uncredited Thomas Haden Church, and the voice of John Turturro.

Theatrically released on February 23, 2001, by 20th Century Fox, the film was a box-office bomb and received generally negative critical reviews.

Plot
Stuart "Stu" Miley is a disillusioned cartoonist whose comic character, a rascal monkey named Monkeybone, is getting an animated series and merchandise, at the constant pestering of his agent and friend, Herb. He plans on proposing to his girlfriend, Julie McElroy, a sleep institute worker who helped him deal with his nightmares by changing his drawing hand, but one night, Stu falls into a coma following a car crash before he can do so. His spirit is taken to Down Town, a surreal and carnival-themed limbo-like landscape populated by mythical beings and figments of its visitors' imaginations, even Monkeybone. Stu and Monkeybone are constantly at each other's throats during his time in Down Town until discovering people can leave Down Town once they are given Exit Passes. Stu is then invited to a party being hosted by the God of Sleep and ruler of Down Town Hypnos.

According to Hypnos, Stu has to steal an Exit Pass from his sister, Death, in order to wake up from his coma in time before the plug is pulled due to Stu and his sister Kimmy making a pact as children after their father's death. Stu and Monkeybone journey to Death's domain disguised as one of her employees and successfully manage to steal an Exit Pass, while narrowly escaping a nightmare Julie inflicts upon Stu in an attempt to wake him by using “Oneirix”, a chemical solution made by Julie that causes nightmare inducement to living creatures.

Back in Down Town, Monkeybone steals the Exit Pass for himself, where it is revealed that the theft was part of a plan orchestrated by Hypnos. Monkeybone enters Stu's body while Stu is imprisoned with other disillusioned or criminal figures throughout history such as Stephen King, Attila the Hun, Jack the Ripper and Lizzie Borden. Hypnos reveals to Stu that he and the denizens of Downtown thrive on nightmares and made a deal with Monkeybone to spread the Oneirix amongst the living in exchange for getting Monkeybone his body to have a life of his own, since he's fed up with being a figment.

Monkeybone is ordered by Hypnos via a nightmare to stay his course, causing Monkeybone to steal the Oneirix from the sleep institute successfully, leaving a decoy in its place. While Monkeybone puts the chemical in farting Monkeybone toys to be given out to the public at a charity banquet, Julie growing wary due to “Stu’s” new behavior. Stu manages to escape with the help of Miss Kitty, a catgirl waitress he befriends, and confronts Death to convince her to send him to back to the living world to stop Monkeybone. Death complies, giving him an hour to do so by putting him in the body of an organ donor with a broken neck.

Stu makes it to the banquet while Monkeybone is about to propose to Julie, while Herb is exposed to the Oneirix in the Monkeybone doll and sees his clothes coming to life in a mirror, causing him to strip naked and flees in panic. Stu finally confesses his love and regrets to Julie for never getting a chance to propose to her. Stu manages to use Monkeybone's origin characteristics to cause him to panic which culminates in the two of them battling one another on a giant Monkeybone balloon, which is soon shot down by a police officer, causing the duo to fall from the sky and back into Down Town.

Back in Down Town, the citizens below cheer on Stu and Monkeybone's fight as they descend from the sky before being caught by a giant robot controlled by Death. Monkeybone is then placed back in Stu's mind by Death, claiming it is where he belongs before she sends Stu back to his proper body. Once Stu is, he and Julie reunite and share a kiss as the still-infected Herb emerges from a nearby fountain and telling everyone to remove their clothes, revealing a riot of monkeys.

Cast
 Brendan Fraser as Stuart "Stu" Miley, a cartoonist and the creator of the Monkeybone franchise. Fraser also plays Monkeybone when he is in Stu's body.
 Bridget Fonda as Dr. Julie McElroy, Stu's love interest.
 Whoopi Goldberg as Death, Hypnos' sister.
 Rose McGowan as Miss Kitty, a catgirl living in Down Town whom Stu befriends.
 Giancarlo Esposito as Hypnos, the God of Sleep and Death's malicious brother.
 Chris Kattan as an organ donor that Stu briefly possesses.
 Dave Foley as Herb, Stu's agent and friend.
 Megan Mullally as Kimmy Miley, Stu's sister.
 Lisa Zane as Medusa, an inhabitant of Down Town.
 Thomas Haden Church (uncredited) as Death's assistant who reads her the names of new arrivals in Down Town.
 Sandra Thigpen as Alice
 Lou Romano as Police officer who shoots down the Monkeybone balloon
 Thomas Molloy as Arnold the Super Reaper, one of Death's minions.
 Jon Bruno as Stephen King, one of Hypnos' prisoners who was tricked into infiltrating Death's domain before Stu.
 Owen Masterson as Jack the Ripper, one of Hypnos' prisoners.
 Shawnee Free Jones as Lizzie Borden, one of Hypnos' prisoners.
 Jen Sung Outerbridge as Atilla the Hun, one of Hypnos' prisoners.
 Ilia Volok as Grigori Rasputin, one of Hypnos' prisoners.
 Claudette Mink as Typhoid Mary, one of Hypnos' prisoners.
 Bob Odenkirk as Head surgeon
 Robert Wuhl (uncredited) as David Stone
 Michael Anthony Jackson as Bug Man, an inhabitant of Down Town with the head of a male human and the body of an insect.
 Doug Jones as Yeti, an inhabitant of Down Town who operates its nightmare-showing movie theater.
 Jody St. Michael as the Centaur, an inhabitant of Down Town that wears cowboy attire.
 Arturo Gil as the rat warden of Down Town's prison that works for Hypnos.
 Frit Fuller and Frat Fuller as Three-Headed Devil, an inhabitant of Down Town depicted with three heads and three legs.
 Brian Steele as Jumbo, a elephant and the piano player at Down Town's local bar.
 Leif Tilden as Cyclops, an inhabitant of Down Town with a large head and arms and a smaller torso and legs.
 Tom Fisher as Community Service Cigarette Sweeper, a camel inhabitant of Down Town.
 Joseph S. Griffo as BBQ Pig, a pig who is a vendor in Down Town.
 Kim Timbers-Patteri as Wasp Woman, a wasp that is often seen with Hypnos.
 Lisa Ebeyer as Betty the Bovine, a cow who is a vendor in Down Town.
 Wayne Doba as Scorpion
 Mark Vinello as Assbackwards
 Nathan Stein as Sea Monster, an inhabitant of Down Town that has a seahorse-like head.
 Ed Holmes as Buffalo Kachina

Voices
 John Turturro as Monkeybone, Stu's raunchy rascal creation and the film's titular main antagonist.
 Brendan Fraser as Stanley (uncredited), a character in the Monkeybone cartoon that recaps his creation of the titular character.
 Ted Rooney as voice of the Grim Reaper.
 Roger L. Jackson as Arnold the Super Reaper.
 Joe Ranft as Streetsquashed Rabbit, a roadkill rabbit that lives in Down Town.
 Bruce Lanoil as Streetsquashed Raccoon, a roadkill raccoon that lives in Down Town.
 Debi Durst as Streetsquashed Snake, a roadkill snake that lives in Down Town.
 Phil Brotherton as Super Mansa
 Jym Dingler as Community Service Cigarette Sweeper
 Leslie Hedger as Assbackwards
 Toby Gleason as Buffalo Kachina
 Allan Trautman as BBQ Pig
 Mike Mitchell as Miss Hudlapp, Stanley's teacher seen in the Monkeybone pilot.
 Lou Romano as Therapist that Stanley sees in the Monkeybone pilot.

Production
The comic book Dark Town, on which Monkeybone is based, was written by Kaja Blackley, illustrated by Vanessa Chong, and published by Mad Monkey Press. The journey from comic to film was initiated by a fan of the comic and member of the San Francisco animation community (Tom "Bags" Sacchi/ChasingDragons Productions NYC) who, without Blackley's knowledge, passed a copy of Dark Town on to one of Selick's producers, Denise Rotina. Selick fell in love with the book and vigorously pursued the rights. In a letter to Kaja, he wrote: "I've never felt any project was closer to my sensibilities than this one." The initial intention was to stay true to the source material, which can be seen in early designs from Selick's company, Twitching Image. However, as the project developed, it eventually evolved into Monkeybone.

Casting
Initially the role of Stuart "Stu" Miley was to be played by Ben Stiller but Stiller dropped out to be in Mystery Men and was replaced by Fraser.

Influences
Much of the film's art bears a strong resemblance to that of Mark Ryden—for example, the bust of Abraham Lincoln as "The Great Emancipator". Stu's pre-therapy painting is very similar to Ryden's The Birth, and according to the credits, was painted by him for the film. The animation style and the themes of the opening sequence in which Stu first encounters Monkeybone are very similar to the work of Swedish cartoonist Magnus Carlsson. The film's plot is influenced by the films Who Framed Roger Rabbit, Cool World and Beetlejuice. Many critics mark a similarity between Dark Town design and Tim Burton's style. The film contains a large number of references to a parody religion called The Church of the SubGenius. In particular, the fictional fast-food chain "Burger God" was originally a SubGenius creation. Additionally, the repeated references to Yetis, and the scene in which Stu (whose body is possessed by Monkeybone) is struck in the head with a golf club by Hypnos in a dream sequence, also echo recurring themes in the Church of the SubGenius.

Reception

Box office
Monkeybone was a failure at the box office; based on a budget of $75 million, the film grossed $5,411,999 domestically and $7,622,365 worldwide.

Critical response
On Rotten Tomatoes, the film has an approval rating of 20% based on 114 reviews, with an average rating of 3.9/10. The site's critical consensus reads, "Though original and full of bizarre visuals, Monkeybone is too shapeless a movie, with unengaging characters and random situations that fail to build up laughs." On Metacritic, the film has a weighted average score of 40 out of 100, based on 28 critics, indicating "mixed or average reviews". Audiences polled by CinemaScore gave the film an average grade of "C" on an A+ to F scale.

Roger Ebert gave the film 1.5 stars out of 4, saying, "The movie labors hard, the special effects are admirable, no expense has been spared, and yet the movie never takes off; it's a bright idea the filmmakers were unable to breathe life into."

In a 2022 interview, Henry Selick said of the film's critical and commercial failure: "I have a few feelings. I don't feel [Monkeybone] would ever have been a big hit as it was... they dumped the film with no publicity, not a single ad, because they just figured well it's a failure, we don't wanna help it any which way. And the funniest thing of all though was that we did get rave reviews in The New York Times, in the L.A. Times... but then for a lot of other critics they were like they're angry about this film... so I have two thoughts: it never would have been a big hit. It certainly would have done better if they advertised it a little... I would still like to do a Director's Cut because there's a lot of cool stuff that was removed... my main lesson learned is, I don't really do well in the live-action universe... I love my world of stop-motion... I went down a slippery slope to make Monkeybone, but the film that came out it's not my vision of what the film could've been, and I just don't thrive in that."

Accolades

See also
 Go motion
 List of biggest box office bombs
 List of stop motion films

References

External links
 
 
 
 
 
 
 

2000s American animated films
2001 films
2001 comedy films
2001 black comedy films
2000s fantasy comedy films
20th Century Fox films
20th Century Fox animated films
1492 Pictures films
American black comedy films
American fantasy comedy films
American films with live action and animation
American dark fantasy films
American adult animated films
Films about animation
Films about comics
Films about fictional painters
Films based on Canadian comics
Films directed by Henry Selick
Films produced by Michael Barnathan
Films with screenplays by Sam Hamm
Films scored by Anne Dudley
Films shot in Los Angeles
Films using stop-motion animation
Cultural depictions of Attila the Hun
Films about Yeti
Films about personifications of death
Limbo
Body swapping in films
2000s English-language films